Nguyễn Như Quỳnh (born in 1954) known as Như Quỳnh, is a Vietnamese actress and People's Artist (NSND). She is also known as an amateur poet.

Nhu Quynh actor graduated in 1971 from the Vietnam Theatre School, today the University of Theatre and Film, Hanoi (SKDA). Two years later, she acted as one of the two female leads in her first film, Bài ca ra trận (1973). Then with her role as the girl Nết in Đến hẹn lại lên (1974), Như Quỳnh won the Best Actress Award at the 3rd Vietnam Film Festival in 1975. Her roles in a series of French co-productions, Indochine (1992), Cyclo (1995) and Vertical Ray of the Sun (2000) introduced her to a foreign audience. In Cyclo Như Quỳnh plays the crime boss who extorts and entraps the young cyclo-taxi driver. In Vertical Ray of Light she plays the oldest of the three Hanoi sisters. 

She is also the owner of Cafe Quynh in Hanoi's Bat Dan Street.

Selected filmography
 1973 Bài ca ra trận (vi) "March to the Front"
 1974 Đến hẹn lại lên (vi), shown in the Soviet Union as "We will meet again"
 1977 Mối tình đầu (vi), "First Love" as leading role Diễm Hương
 1992 Indochine, as Sao
 1995 Cyclo dir. Trần Anh Hùng
 2000 The Vertical Ray of the Sun, dir. Trần Anh Hùng
 2005 Bride of Silence, 
 2006 Story of Pao, as old mother
 2006 The White Silk Dress, as aunty Phán
 2007 Saigon Eclipse, 
 2007 Golden Bride, South Korean co-production
 2011 Lời nguyền huyết ngải' "Blood Curse"

References

1954 births
Living people
20th-century Vietnamese actresses
21st-century Vietnamese actresses
Vietnamese film actresses
Place of birth missing (living people)